Richie Purdy (born 12 March 1972, in Dublin) is an Irish former footballer.

Purdy made his League of Ireland début for Home Farm against EMFA on 6 November 1988. He spent six seasons with Dundalk, winning the League with the team in 1994/95 (scoring 2 goals in 26 appearances). During this tenure at Dundalk he won the PFAI "Young Player of the Year" award in 1992/93 PFAI.

Purdy later moved to Derry City for one season where he won another league title for the 1996/97 season. He joined Shamrock Rovers in the summer of 1997 where he stayed for four seasons, making two appearances in Europe (scoring once).

Purdy was capped by Ireland at U15, U16, U17, U18 and U21 levels. He played in two qualifiers in the 1990 UEFA European Under-18 Football Championship qualifying campaign.

His eldest son, Daniel, is who plays for Longford Town and has played for Ireland U15s and U17s. His other son Richie plays for Shamrock Rovers U19 in the League of Ireland U19 Division.

Honours
 League of Ireland Premier Division: 2
 Dundalk F.C. 1994–95
 Derry City 1996–97
 FAI Super Cup
 Shamrock Rovers 1998
PFAI Young Player of the Year:
 Dundalk - 1992/93

References

1972 births
Living people
League of Ireland players
Shamrock Rovers F.C. players
Dundalk F.C. players
University College Dublin A.F.C. players
Derry City F.C. players
Home Farm F.C. players
Kildare County F.C. players
Kilkenny City A.F.C. players
Republic of Ireland youth international footballers
Republic of Ireland under-21 international footballers
Republic of Ireland association footballers
Association football defenders
Association footballers from County Dublin